The 1999–2000 Eastern European Hockey League season, was the fifth season of the multi-national ice hockey league. 13 teams participated in the league, and HC Berkut-Kyiv of Ukraine won the championship.

First round

EEHL A

EEHL B

Second round

Group A

Group B

Playoffs

3rd place
HK Liepajas Metalurgs 2 HK Neman Grodno 0

External links
Season on hockeyarchives.info

2
Eastern European Hockey League seasons